The Wanga (AbaWanga) are a tribe of the Luhya people of Kenya.

Wanga may also refer to:
Wanga (mythology), figure in African mythology
Wanga Kingdom, a Kenyan Bantu kingdom

People with the surname

Allan Wanga (born 1985), Kenyan footballer
Federico Wanga (died 1218), Prince-bishop of Trento
Gilbert Imbula Wanga (born 1992), Belgian footballer
Gladys Atieno Nyasuna Wanga, Kenyan politician
Javier Wanga (born 1981), Aruban judoka
Jean Dénis Wanga (born 1975), Cameroonian footballer
Jerónimo Elavoko Wanga (died 2007), Angolan politician
Soleil Wanga, DR Congolese musician

See also
Obeah and Wanga, terms used by occultist Aleister Crowley

 Includes people with first name Wanga